Psophus stridulus, commonly known as the rattle grasshopper, is a species of grasshopper of the family Acrididae.

Description

The basic colouration of the body varies from brown to grey–ochre or black, with lighter spots. The pronotum is strongly convex. These grasshoppers are winged, but wings are short and unfit for flight in females, fully developed in males. The hindwings are bright red-orange, with a black apex. The adults occur from July or August up to October.

Subspecies
 Psophus stridulus samniticus Baccetti, 1958
 Psophus stridulus stridulus (Linnaeus, 1758)

Distribution
This species can be found in Central and Southern Europe, in the eastern Palearctic realm (Siberia, Russian Far East, Middle Asia, China, Mongolia, Eastern Asia), and in the Near East.

Habitat
It is known as a xeric specialist because of this, and often interacts with other species like Zygaena ephialtes in these environments.

References

 Biolib
  Global Species

Oedipodinae
Insects described in 1758
Orthoptera of Europe
Taxa named by Carl Linnaeus